Affection (also known as vowel affection, infection or vowel mutation), in the linguistics of the Celtic languages, is the change in the quality of a vowel under the influence of the vowel of the following final syllable.

It is a type of anticipatory (or regressive) assimilation at a distance. The vowel that triggers the change was later normally lost. Some grammatical suffixes cause i-affection.

The two main types of affection are a-affection and i-affection. There is also u-affection, which is more usually referred to as u-infection. I-affection is an example of i-mutation and may be compared to the Germanic umlaut, and a-affection is similar to Germanic a-mutation. More rarely, the term "affection", like "umlaut", may be applied to other languages and is then a synonym for i-mutation generally.

See also

 Apocope
 Metaphony

References

Celtic languages
Brittonic languages
Welsh language
Cornish language
Breton language
Goidelic languages
Scottish Gaelic language
Phonology
Linguistic morphology
Orthography